Orlen Lietuva (former Mažeikių Nafta) is a subsidiary of the Polish PKN Orlen and it owns the Mažeikiai oil refinery as well as the oil-processing plant in Lithuania. It is the only oil refinery in the Baltic States.

Refinery 
The Mažeikiai refinery, located near the town of Mažeikiai, has a design processing capacity of 15 million tons of crude oil per year. However, it is more efficient to process around 8 million tons of crude oil, while using the remaining capacity for processing other feedstock. Historically, the primary feedstock has been Russian crude oil transported via the Druzhba pipeline, however the relevant branch of this system has been closed in Russian territory since July 2006, ostensibly for repairs. Crude oil is now being supplied by the Būtingė oil terminal (see below). The Mažeikiai refinery is the only oil refinery in the Baltic States.

Pipeline system 
Mažeikių Nafta operates a system of pipelines with a total length of around 500 kilometers. This system includes two pump stations near Biržai and another near Joniškis, crude oil pipelines to the Mažeikiai Refinery and Būtingė Terminal, a crude oil pipeline leading to Ventspils, and another products pipeline supplying diesel fuel to the same location.
Construction of pipelines in Lithuania started in 1966, with the first crude oil being put through them in 1968. In 1992, the company Naftotiekis was founded for the operation of Lithuanian pipelines, which became part of Mažeikių Nafta in 1998.

Būtingė Marine Terminal 
The Būtingė oil terminal is a facility owned by Mažeikių Nafta, situated in an all-year-round ice-free area of the Baltic Sea on the Lithuanian coastline near the town of Būtingė, north of Palanga. The project began in 1995 when the company Būtingės Nafta was established for the purpose of constructing and operating the Terminal. In 1998, Būtingės Nafta was merged into Mažeikių Nafta.

The first tanker was loaded in Būtingė in the summer of 1999 and took on board a shipment of YUKOS crude oil. The Terminal can export up to 14 million tons of crude oil a year but can also function as an import terminal.

During the construction of the facility, an environmental monitoring program was introduced that includes tests of sea and ground waters. With the start of the terminal operations, an expanded environmental monitoring program was launched. This included a computer-based leak detection system.

The complex of the Būtingė Terminal consists of a crude oil pipeline that connects the facility with the Mažeikiai Refinery inland, onshore terminal equipment and tanks at Būtingė, an offshore pipeline, and a single point mooring (SPM) buoy which lies  7 km offshore.

Privatization 

The company was first privatized by the Lithuanian government in 1999, when it was bought by Williams Companies, a group based in the USA. Later, Williams ran into financial trouble and their stake in Mažeikių Nafta was bought by the Russian company Yukos.
However, in 2003 Yukos ran afoul of the Russian authorities and was required to pay billions of dollars in taxes. Facing bankruptcy, Yukos began to sell off its assets, including Mažeikių Nafta.

Several potential buyers from Russia, Kazakhstan and Poland showed interest in acquiring the refinery, whose majority stakeholder was now Yukos International, a Yukos syndicate. After several months of talks the proposal from Polish company PKN Orlen was found most lucrative and chosen. Additionally, it was deemed most desirable by Lithuania, which has been aiming to avoid the refinery and infrastructure being bought out by Russian interests due to the national security concerns. To force the sale to Yukos for lower price, Russia has shut down the only land pipeline, which New York Times described as "tools for intimidation and blackmail".

The agreement between Orlen and Yukos International to buy out the latter's 53.7% stake in the company, was made in June 2006. Several weeks later, PKN Orlen signed a deal with the Lithuanian government to buy a further 30.66%. The European Union's regulatory authority approved the deal on November 7, after ruling that it would not significantly harm competition in the European economic area or any substantial part of it. The buyout was finalized on 15 December 2006, with US$1.492 billion paid by PKN Orlen to Yukos International, and US$851.8 million to the Lithuanian Government.

Russian hostilities

Druzhba pipeline Lithuanian branch shutdown

On 29 July 2006 Russia shut down oil export to Mažeikių oil refinery in Lithuania after an oil spill on the Druzhba pipeline system occurred in Russia's Bryansk oblast, near the point where a line to Belarus and Lithuania branches off the main export pipeline. Transneft said it would need one year and nine months to repair the damaged section. Although Russia cited technical reasons for stopping oil deliveries to Lithuania, Lithuania claims that the oil supply was stopped because Lithuania sold the Mažeikių refinery to Polish company PKN Orlen in an effort to avoid the refinery and infrastructure being bought out by Russian interests. Russian crude oil is now being transshipped via the Būtingė oil terminal.

Fire
On October 12, 2006, a major fire erupted in the plant around 2:30 pm. The cause appears to have been a leak. The fire was extinguished after 8 pm the same day, although some spot fires were still being put out the next day. During the fire, a 50-meter height vacuum tower collapsed, oil products leaked out, and a series of explosions were heard; The blaze covered about 800 square meters at one point.  23 firefighting vehicles were brought into the scene of the accident and eyewitness accounts said that fires reached 150m in height and could be seen from several kilometers away. A black cloud of smoke could be seen from a great distance, and drifted towards the nearby Latvian border. There were no casualties among personnel. Damages incurred are estimated around 38 million Euro, as well as around 30 million in lost revenue due to production losses. While significant, when compared with the total output and profits of the plant, they are not as large as had been feared. Initially, after the fire, serious doubts were raised by various media over whether PKN Orlen would go through with the deal to buy the company  (although these were immediately denied by Orlen representatives). In the end, the blaze did not stop the takeover from going ahead. Suspicions were raised by various high-profile persons as to whether the fire was an accident, or industrial sabotage on the part of the Russian energy companies in revenge for not being offered to buy the company. The vice-leader of the Russian Duma, Konstantin Kosachev, stated that "instability will continue to plague the refinery until the Lithuanians finally realize which partners one should choose" only a few hours before the start of the blaze.

References

External links

 New Installations Started their Trip from Klaipeda to Mazeikiai
 AB Mažeikių Nafta Modernized Installations in Record Time
Orlen Lietuva Company Website

Oil companies of Lithuania
Companies listed on Nasdaq Vilnius
Oil refineries in Lithuania
Buildings and structures built in the Soviet Union
Oil companies of the Soviet Union
Non-renewable resource companies established in 1964
1964 establishments in Lithuania
Companies based in Mažeikiai
Oil refineries in the Soviet Union